The Spiller Range is a small subrange of the Kitimat Ranges, located on the northeastern end of Porcher Island, British Columbia, Canada.

References

Spiller Range in the Canadian Mountain Encyclopedia

Kitimat Ranges